St. Clair County is a county located in the western portion of the U.S. state of Missouri. As of the 2020 census, the population was 9,284. Its county seat is Osceola.   The largest city is Appleton City. The county was organized in 1841 and named after General Arthur St. Clair, Governor of the Northwest Territory. St. Clair was also the 9th president of the United States in Congress Assembled. Under his presidency, the Northwest Ordinance and United States Constitution were passed.

According to the April 1907 issue of The Century Magazine, for well over 30 years (dating from 1870) St. Clair County was in open rebellion against the U.S. Government, refusing to pay interest on bonds which it had issued to assist in the building of a railroad, which was never built.

Geography

Adjacent counties
 Henry County (north)
 Benton County (northeast)
 Hickory County (east)
 Polk County (southeast)
 Cedar County (south)
 Vernon County (southwest)
 Bates County (northwest)

Major highways
  U.S. Route 54
  Route 13
  Route 52
  Route 82

Demographics

As of the census of 2000, there were 9,652 people, 4,040 households, and 2,791 families residing in the county. The population density was 14 people per square mile (6/km2). There were 5,205 housing units at an average density of 8 per square mile (3/km2). The racial makeup of the county was 97.36% White, 0.23% Black or African American, 0.75% Native American, 0.15% Asian, 0.02% Pacific Islander, 0.29% from other races, and 1.21% from two or more races. Approximately 0.98% of the population were Hispanic or Latino of any race.

There were 4,040 households, out of which 26.30% had children under the age of 18 living with them, 57.60% were married couples living together, 7.70% had a female householder with no husband present, and 30.90% were non-families. 27.40% of all households were made up of individuals, and 14.80% had someone living alone who was 65 years of age or older. The average household size was 2.34 and the average family size was 2.83.

In the county, the population was spread out, with 23.00% under the age of 18, 5.60% from 18 to 24, 22.90% from 25 to 44, 27.20% from 45 to 64, and 21.30% who were 65 years of age or older. The median age was 44 years. For every 100 females there were 98.60 males. For every 100 females age 18 and over, there were 94.30 males.

The median income for a household in the county was $25,321, and the median income for a family was $31,498. Males had a median income of $23,231 versus $18,351 for females. The per capita income for the county was $14,025. About 16.20% of families and 19.60% of the population were below the poverty line, including 25.30% of those under age 18 and 17.60% of those age 65 or over.

2020 Census

Education

Public schools
 Appleton City R-II School District – Appleton City
 Appleton City Elementary School (K–5)
 Appleton City High School (06-12)
 Hudson R-IX School District – Appleton City
 Hudson Elementary School (PK–8)
 Osceola Public Schools – Osceola
 Osceola Elementary School (PK–6)
 Osceola High School (7–12)
 Roscoe C-1 School District – Roscoe
 Roscoe Elementary School (PK–8)
 Lakeland R-III School District – Lowry City & Deepwater
 Lakeland Elementary School

Public libraries

 Appleton City Public Library

 St. Clair County Library-Main Library (Osceola)

 St. Clair County Library-Lowry City Branch

Politics

Local
The Republican Party predominantly controls politics at the local level in St. Clair County.

State

All of St. Clair County is a part of Missouri's 125th District in the Missouri House of Representatives and is represented by
Warren Love (R-Osceola).

All of St. Clair County is a part of Missouri's 28th District in the Missouri Senate. The seat is currently Held by Sandy Crawford.

Federal

All of St. Clair County is included in Missouri's 4th Congressional District and is currently represented by Vicky Hartzler (R-Harrisonville) in the U.S. House of Representatives.

Political culture

Communities

Cities
 Appleton City
 Lowry City
 Osceola (county seat)

Villages
 Collins
 Gerster
 Roscoe
 Vista

Unincorporated communities

Chalk Level
Cobb
Crooks Springs
Harper
Iconium
Johnson City
Monegaw Springs
Ohio
Oyer
Pape
 Raney
Taberville
Tiffin

Townships
St. Clair County is divided into 16 townships:

See also
 National Register of Historic Places listings in St. Clair County, Missouri

References

External links
 Digitized 1930 Plat Book of St. Clair County  from University of Missouri Division of Special Collections, Archives, and Rare Books
 St.Clair County Sheriff's Office

 
1841 establishments in Missouri
Populated places established in 1841